The Department for Correctional Services is the department of the Government of South Australia responsible for adult prisoners, including supervision of offenders and their rehabilitation, in order to protect the public against further crime in the state. There are nine prisons in the state, including the Adelaide Remand Centre for offenders on remand.

References

Correctional Services
Law enforcement in Australia
Prison and correctional agencies
Penal system in South Australia